Jason Klatt (Born 18. April 1986) is a Canadian professional pool player. Klatt has represented Canada at three straight World Cup of Pool events, between 2009 and 2011. Klatt's best performance at a world championship came at the 2014 WPA World Nine-ball Championship, where he reached the last 32, before losing to Carlo Biado 11–5.

Achievements
 2017 Molson Cup Canadian Bar Table Championship
 2013 CSI US Bar Table 8-Ball Championship 
 2012 New York City 9-Ball Championship
 2008 Pennsylvania State 9-Ball Championship
 2008 Canadian Tour Season Finale
 2008 Canadian 9-Ball Tour

References

External links

Canadian pool players
Living people
1986 births
20th-century Canadian people
21st-century Canadian people